Fenghuang Town station, is a station on Line 6 of the Shenzhen Metro. It opened on 18 August 2020. After 23:30, some train services stops here.

Station layout

Exits

Gallery

References

Shenzhen Metro stations
Railway stations in Guangdong
Railway stations in China opened in 2020